Harimius is a genus of beetles in the family Cerambycidae, and the only species in the genus is Harimius atripennis. It was described by Fairmaire in 1889.

References

Dorcasominae
Beetles described in 1889
Monotypic beetle genera